Curtis Gedig (born September 14, 1991) is a Canadian-German professional ice hockey defenseman, currently playing with the Kassel Huskies in second-tier DEL2.

Career 
Gedig was born in Penticton, British Columbia. From 2008 to 2010, Gedig played for the Merritt Centennials, Cowichan Valley Capitals and Vernon Vipers in the BCHL. He was selected by the New Jersey Devils (round 7, 204th overall) in the 2009 NHL draft.

Gedig enrolled at Ohio State University in 2010 and served as captain his junior and senior year. He was named 2011 Rookie of the Year and 2013 Best Defensive Player by his Ohio State teammates.

In the 2014-15 season, he saw the ice in 30 games for ECHL's Colorado Eagles, tallying three goals and 14 assists. Gedig landed his first job overseas in June 2015, when putting pen to paper on a one-year deal with Stjernen, a member of Norway's GET-Liga. He exploded statistically in the 2015-16 season, scoring 26 goals in 49 contests for Stjernen while dishing out 29 assists. His production led all defensemen in scoring and goals scored. In a bid to help their team re-sign Gedig for a second season, the Stjernen fans started raising money, but the Penticton native eventually opted to accept an offer from Switzerland. In March 2016, Gedig inked a two-year deal with EHC Olten of the National League B (NLB), but parted company with the club at the conclusion of the 2016-17 campaign.

In June 2017, he signed with the Stavanger Oilers of the Norwegian GET-Liga. In May 2018, Gedig inked a deal with the Fischtown Pinguins of the German DEL. He left after the 2018-19 campaign. On December 28, 2019, he was signed by the Kassel Huskies of the German DEL2.

References

External links 
 Curtis Gedig at eliteprospects.com

1991 births
Living people
Sportspeople from Penticton
Ice hockey people from British Columbia
Canadian ice hockey defencemen
Canadian expatriate ice hockey players in Germany
Canadian expatriate ice hockey players in Norway
Canadian expatriate ice hockey players in Switzerland
Canadian people of German descent
Colorado Eagles players
EHC Olten players
Fischtown Pinguins players
Ohio State Buckeyes men's ice hockey players
Stavanger Oilers players
Stjernen Hockey players